David Nesta "Ziggy" Marley (born 17 October 1968) is a Jamaican singer, songwriter, musician, actor and philanthropist. He is the son of reggae icon Bob Marley and Rita Marley. He led the family band Ziggy Marley and the Melody Makers until 2002, with whom he released eight studio albums. After the disbandment, Ziggy launched a successful solo career by having released eight solo studio albums on his own record company, Tuff Gong Worldwide. Ziggy continues his father’s heritage to record and self-release all of his music. Marley is an eight-time Grammy Award winner and a Daytime Emmy Award recipient.

Early life
David Nesta Marley was born in Kingston, Jamaica, on October 17, 1968. He grew up in Trenchtown, a poor neighborhood of Kingston, and in Wilmington, Delaware, where he attended elementary school for a few years. Ziggy grew up very active, playing soccer and running the mountains, a lifestyle passed on from his parents. As the oldest son of Bob and Rita Marley, Ziggy grew up surrounded by music from an early age. He received guitar and drum lessons from his father and began sitting in on Wailers recording sessions by the age of ten.

Career

1979-1984: Family beginnings
In the earliest known record of his musical career, Marley performed as part of a singing group called The Seven Do Bees, made up of him and his classmates, and wherein he was given the stage name "Freddie Dic". The name never stuck, however, and instead, David went on to become known as "Ziggy", a nickname often reported to have been given to him by his father Bob Marley, meaning "little spliff". However, Ziggy stated the following to Melody Maker magazine in 1988: "Me name David but me big Bowie fan. So at the time of the Ziggy Stardust album, me call meself Ziggy and now everyone do."

During the late 1970s, Ziggy could also be seen alongside his brother Stephen at some of their father's larger concerts around Jamaica and abroad. In 1978, the duo appeared on stage at the One Love Peace Concert in Kingston, and the following year at Reggae Sunsplash II in Montego Bay.

1985-2002: Ziggy Marley & The Melody Makers

In 1979, Ziggy and his siblings Sharon, Cedella and Stephen formed the Melody Makers (named after the British weekly pop/rock music newspaper, Melody Maker) and made their recording debut with "Children Playing in the Streets". The track was written for them by their father, who had composed the song for them four years earlier. All royalties from the single were pledged to the United Nations, to aid its efforts during the International Year of the Child.

The Melody Makers made their onstage debut as a group on 23 September 1979, performing on the same bill as their father for the first and only time at the "Roots Rock Reggae" two-day concert series in Kingston's National Arena. Ziggy was 11 years old at the time. Notable other early moments in Ziggy's musical history include a performance with Stephen at their father's funeral in 1981, and later that year the Melody Makers released their second single, "What A Plot", under the family's Tuff Gong record label. The Melody Makers recorded an unreleased album titled Children Playing in 1979.

After Bob Marley's death in 1981, Ziggy began performing in his place alongside the Wailers at various shows around Jamaica, and in 1984 the group went on tour in support of the year's Bob Marley Legend compilation album release. The Melody Makers' first fully released album was Play the Game Right in 1985. Their 1988 album Conscious Party was a major worldwide hit and received a Grammy Award for Best Reggae Album. Ziggy Marley and the Melody Makers won three Grammy Awards and five nominations in total before disbanding in 2002.

2003-2006: Dragonfly/Solo Career beginning
After the Melody Makers disbanded, Ziggy Marley launched a solo career. His debut solo album, Dragonfly, was released in April 2003. The album featured the single "True To Myself", which remains one of his biggest hits. The track "Rainbow in the Sky" features both Flea and John Frusciante of the Red Hot Chili Peppers, while "Melancholy Mood" features only Flea.

2006-present: Tuff Gong Worldwide (independent artist)
In July 2006, his second solo album, Love Is My Religion, was released on his independent record label Tuff Gong Worldwide. The album won a Grammy Award for Best Reggae Album, making it Marley's 4th Grammy win.
He also performs the theme song for children's animated show Arthur.

Marley performed a duet with Donna Summer for her 2008 album Crayons. In May 2009, his third solo album Family Time, was released on Tuff Gong Worldwide.  Family Time was presented as a children's album and features family and friends: Rita Marley, Cedella Marley, Judah Marley, Paul Simon, Willie Nelson, Jack Johnson, Toots Hibbert, Laurie Berkner, Elizabeth Mitchell, and more. This album won a Grammy Award for Best Musical Album for Children. In June 2011, Marley released his fourth album Wild and Free. The title track, featuring Woody Harrelson, was available for free with the pre-order of Ziggy's first comic book, Marijuanaman.

In 2013, Marley's song "I Love You Too" won him a Daytime Emmy Award in the Outstanding Original Song – Children's and Animation category, after it was used in the Cbeebies animation 3rd & Bird. Ziggy released the children's book, I Love You Too, based on the song and illustrated by Agnieszka Jatkowska. In April 2014, Ziggy Marley released his fifth solo studio album, entitled Fly Rasta. Fly Rasta won the Grammy for Best Reggae Album at the 57th Grammy Awards. Marley later announced his sixth solo album Ziggy Marley to be released spring 2016.

In May 2018, Marley released his most recent studio album, Rebellion Rises, through Tuff Gong Worldwide. The album received rave reviews upon release. Cryptic Rock gave the album 5 out of 5 stars, stating "Politically and socially relevant, Rebellion Rises is a war of music, creating peace with a purpose.". Island Stage called the album "a 10-track masterpiece that continues his father’s tradition of promoting emancipation from mental slavery through education, social activism, and healthy living." Reggaeville said the album "is not an angry record. It is not a bitter record. But, it is not a record of hope, either. The time of hoping for change is a notion Marley considers past due. This is a record of action, and for Ziggy Marley, the time for action is now."

Personal life

Ziggy Marley is the eldest son of Bob Marley and Rita Marley. His brothers are Stephen Marley, Julian Marley, Ky-mani Marley, Robert Nesta Marley, Jr, Rohan Marley and Damian Marley. His sisters are Sharon Marley, Cedella Marley, Karen Marley, Stephanie Marley and Serita Stewart.

He is married to Orly Agai, an Israeli of Iranian-Jewish descent, who is a former vice-president of William Morris Agency. The couple have four children: one daughter, Judah Victoria, and three sons, Gideon Robert Nesta, Abraham Selassie Robert Nesta, and Isaiah Sion Robert Nesta.  He also three children from previous relationships: a son, Bambaata (b. 1989), a daughter, Justice (b. 1991), and a daughter named Zuri (b. 1995).

Philanthropy

U.R.G.E. Foundation
The Unlimited Resources Giving Enlightenment (U.R.G.E.) was founded in 2007 by Ziggy Marley. It is a non-profit, charity foundation working towards improving educational, health and community environments for children.

U.R.G.E acts worldwide, but their main acting areas include Jamaica and Ethiopia, among other African countries. U.R.G.E.'s missions include action and awareness.

Action:

Seek communities that may benefit from U.R.G.E.'s help
Raise funds via individual and corporate donations, product sales, ticket sales, and charitable events
Collect and donate the items (clothing, toys, school supplies, food) that are most needed by children and their communities
Provide assistance and resources that enable communities to develop and self-sustain

Awareness:

Raise awareness on current events, social developments and political landscapes which affect children
Partner with other artists, celebrities, brands and charitable organizations to draw attention to the needs of the communities in need of donations
Research the most accurate and unbiased information to the media and public
Share U.R.G.E.'s stories of success through photos, stories and letters

Efforts
The Chepstow Basic School in Portland, Jamaica has been working with U.R.G.E. since 2008, constantly improving its different areas. Over the years, financial and humanitarian assistance has been aided. Some examples include: financial support for teacher salaries, construction of music rooms and playgrounds, donation of musical instruments and bicycles and the hosting of health and dental clinics. U.R.G.E. frequently posts updates in their website about current and pasts projects with Chepstow. 
Aided with tuition assistance for the Promise Learning Center, a special education institution in Kingston, Jamaica. It provides academic, technical and social traning for children with Autism and other learning disabilities.
Provided financial aid to Robert Gordon, a top student from Richmond Park Preparatory School in Kingston, Jamaica.
Donated books and toys to Glenhope Nursery in Kingston, Jamaica. Glenhope Nursery is a shelter for abandoned, abused, neglected, orphaned or disabled babies and toddlers.
Aided Belvedere Middle School student Kimberly Vargas in participating in the LA Swish basketball program.
Donated funds for a pacemaker for a surgery in Jamaica.
Donated equipment (including laryngoscope sets) to the surgical ward and burnt unit at the Bustamante Hospital for Children in Kingston, Jamaica. 
Donated toys to SOS Children's Villages International orphanage in Brazil.
Sponsored a free dental clinic in Jamaica alongside HealthCare International. Over the span of a week, free checkups and dental care were offered to more than 200 students and local residents. Dental products such as toothbrushes and toothpaste were also given free of charge. Dr. Eli Davidyan was the lead dentist involved in the clinic.
Marley appeared alongside his family on UGG's Holiday Campaign and donated US$50,000 to U.R.G.E and HOLA.
Teamed up with Jamaican institutions "BossMom" and "Food for the Poor" (FFTP) to help with BossMom's program "BossMom Builds", which helps build homes for women in Jamaica, providing all the basic necessities such as water, appliances and sustainable energy sources.
Marley also donates to U.R.G.E. a portion of proceeds from sales and streams of his albums Family Time and More Family Time. He also donates a dollar of every ticket sale he makes to U.R.G.E.

Other Philanthropic Works
 Disney included Ziggy Marley and the Melody Makers' song "Give A Little Love" to their 1991 charity album "For Our Children". All the proceeds were donated to the Pediatric AIDS Foundation.
 In 2007, Marley signed on as an official supporter of Little Kids Rock, a nonprofit organization that provides free musical instruments and free lessons to children in public schools throughout the United States. He has visited with children in the program and sits on the organization's board of directors as an honorary member.
 In 2008, Marley joined forces with H&M and other celebrities for the “Fashion Against AIDS” collaboration. This collaboration served as a means to raise awareness about HIV. Marley designed a T-shirt with “Love is my Religion” written on it (the title of his then-latest record), in the traditional Rastafarian colors (green, gold and red). 
In 2011, Marley lent his voice and likeness to the Physicians Committee for Responsible Medicine for a print ad campaign to promote healthy vegetarian living.
 In 2012, Marley recorded a special version of "Personal Revolution" from his 2011 album Wild and Free for the Rotary International "End Polio Now" compilation album. All the proceeds went towards Rotary's campaign to help end Polio. Marley is a collaborator with Rotary to this day, using his social media platforms to help raise awareness about the ongoing efforts to eradicate Polio around the world. 
 In 2015, Marley performed a benefit concert for John Varvatos’s annual Stuart House fundraiser for the UCLA Rape Treatment Center program. More than US$950,000 was raised during the event. 
 In 2017, Marley partnered with the Heart of Los Angeles, a non-profit organization dedicated to giving greater opportunities to the less fortunate youth. He also performed and met with the children at HOLA's  25th Anniversary Celebration. 
 In 2019, Marley headlined the L.A. location of the World’s Biggest Sleepout at the Hollywood Bowl, an event organized globally by CEO Sleepout UK to combat homelessness and poverty.
 Also in 2019, Marley took part in Kidspace Children’s Museum’s 2019 Summer Kids Food Festival, aimed to teach children about the benefits of balanced food choices an environmentally-focused eating habits. 
 In that same year, Marley was honored by the Creative Community for Peace (CCFP) in their 2nd annual Ambassadors of Peace Gala in Los Angeles. CCFP works to bridge the power of music and bringing people together. In the event, Marley expressed his connection with the Israeli population and spread his message of love and peace.
 Marley was an outspoken advocate for saving the iguanas of the Jamaican Goat Islands, working with the International Iguana Foundation and taking part in a California Science Center exhibit to raise awareness for the cause.  
 In 2021, Marley participated in a performance for National Geographic’s virtual Earth Day Celebration and discussed climate and environmental issues facing our planet. “We’re making art to make a change and challenge the status quo. We need more art like that in this time. We need more music like that. We need more artists like that. So I am just happy that we are using art in that way.”
 Also in 2021, Marley recorded an acoustic version of his song "Shalom Salaam" from his 2003 album Dragonfly alongside the Jerusalem Youth Chorus  to raise awareness and promote peaceful environments between the Israeli and Palestinian communities. "The chorus empowers youth from East & West Jerusalem with the responsibility to speak and sing their truths as they become leaders in their communities and inspire singers and listeners around the world to work for peace, justice, inclusion, and equality."

Other works

Acting and voice-overs

Musical Features

Public Appearances
Marley and his daughter Judah made an appearance in the 2009 Macy's Thanksgiving Day Parade.

Discography

Albums with the Melody Makers 
1985: Play the Game Right
1986: Hey World!
1988: Conscious Party
1989: One Bright Day
1991: Jahmekya
 1993: Joy and Blues
 1995:  Free Like We Want 2 B
 1997: Fallen Is Babylon
 1999: The Spirit of Music
 2000: Ziggy Marley & the Melody Makers Live, Vol. 1

Solo albums

 2003: Dragonfly
 2006: Love Is My Religion
 2009: Family Time
 2011: Wild and Free
 2014: Fly Rasta
 2016: Ziggy Marley
 2018: Rebellion Rises
 2020: More Family Time

Live albums
 2008: Love Is My Religion Live
 2009: Ziggy Live From Soho
 2013: Ziggy Marley in Concert
 2017: We are the People Tour

Awards

Grammy Awards
Ziggy has won eight awards from fifteen nominations.

Other awards and nominations

References

External links

 
 Official Site of the Marley Brothers
 Official Melody Makers website
 

 

1968 births
Living people
Hollywood United players
Jamaican reggae singers
Jamaican guitarists
Male guitarists
Jamaican songwriters
Jamaican male singers
Jamaican Rastafarians
Jamaican people of Cuban descent
Jamaican people of English descent
Jamaican people of Ghanaian descent
Z
Grammy Award winners
Virgin Records artists
Elektra Records artists
Daytime Emmy Award winners
Musicians from Kingston, Jamaica
People from Saint Andrew Parish, Jamaica
Ziggy Marley and the Melody Makers members
Association footballers not categorized by position
Association football players not categorized by nationality